The 2009 Canadian Mixed Curling Championship was held from November 9 to 16, 2008 at the Arniatok Arena in Iqaluit, Nunavut. It was the first national championships of any sport to be held in Nunavut.

Team Manitoba, consisting of Sean Grassie, Allison Nimik, Ross Derksen and Krendra Green won its eighth national mixed title. Two members of the winning team (Grassie and Nimik) represented Canada at the 2009 World Mixed Doubles Curling Championship, where they won a bronze medal.

Teams
The teams are as follows:

Round-robin standings
Final round-robin standings

Results

Draw 1

Draw 2

Draw 3

Draw 4

Draw 5

Draw 6

Draw 7

Draw 8

Draw 9

Draw 10

Draw 11

Draw 12

Draw 13

Draw 14

Draw 15

Draw 16

Draw 17

Tiebreaker

Playoffs

Semifinal

Final

External links
Event website

References

2008 in Canadian curling
Canadian Mixed Curling Championship
Iqaluit
2008 in Nunavut
Curling in Nunavut
November 2008 sports events in Canada